Sirač is a settlement and municipality in Bjelovar-Bilogora County, Croatia. There are 2,218 inhabitants; 73% are Croats, 14% Serbs, and 11% Czechs. The following settlements make up the municipality: Barica, Bijela, Donji Borki, Gornji Borki, Kip, Miljanovac, Pakrani, Sirač, Šibovac.

It is believed that the settlement of Gornji Borki contains a mass grave from World War II.

References

Municipalities of Croatia
Populated places in Bjelovar-Bilogora County